Little Ida is a 1981 Norwegian-Swedish drama film directed by Laila Mikkelsen. The picture is based on the novel Little Ida by Marit Paulsen and set in Norway during World War II.   

Sunniva Lindekleiv, Lise Fjeldstad and Rønnaug Alten shared the award for Best Actress at the 18th Guldbagge Awards.

Cast
 Sunniva Lindekleiv as Ida
 Lise Fjeldstad as Ida's mother
 Arne Lindtner Næss as Idas nye pappa
 Howard Halvorsen as Bjørn, Ida's older brother
 Minken Fosheim as Helga
 Ellen Westerfjell as Reija
 Rønnaug Alten as Mrs. Revaasen
 Gunnar Olram as Mr. Revaasen
 Anne-Lise Tangstad as Organist
 Odd Remen as Teacher
 Erik Hivju as Tysk soldat
 Randi Koch as Reijas mor
 Jan Erik Aune as Tysk officer

References

External links
 
 

1981 films
1981 drama films
Norwegian drama films
Swedish drama films
1980s Norwegian-language films
Swedish-language films
1980s Swedish films
Films set in Norway
Films shot in Norway
Films based on Norwegian novels
Norwegian World War II films